35th–Bronzeville–IIT (formerly Tech–35th) is an 'L' station on the CTA's Green Line, located in the Douglas community area. It is situated at 16 E 35th Street, just east of State Street.

History
The station opened on June 6, 1892. In October 1962, the station, then known as "Tech-35th", caught fire. The northbound platform was destroyed, and service between the adjacent  and  stations was suspended for four days. The station operated using temporary platforms until its renovation in 1965.

Currently, the station serves the historic neighborhood of Bronzeville as well as the Illinois Institute of Technology campus, which is located immediately across State Street from the station. In April 2011, a new Metra station opened between the two CTA stations, providing a convenient transfer point for those traveling to and from the suburbs.

Walt Disney worked here as a guard and gate man as a teenager in 1918.

Layout
The station features a farecard-only entrance at 3400S, on what would normally be 34th Street.

North of this station, the Green Line tracks pass directly over the McCormick Tribune Campus Center. In order to reduce the impact of noise from passing trains on the facility, the tracks are enclosed in a 530-foot tube made from concrete and stainless steel.

Gallery

Bus connections
CTA
29 State
31 31st (Weekdays only) 
35 31st/35th

Notes and references

Notes

References

External links 
 35th–Bronzeville–IIT Station Page
 35th Street entrance from Google Maps Street View

CTA Green Line stations
Douglas, Chicago
Railway stations in the United States opened in 1892
Railway stations in Illinois at university and college campuses